The mud catshark or brown catshark (Bythaelurus lutarius) is a species of catshark in the family Scyliorhinidae. It is found in Mozambique and Somalia. Its natural habitat is the open seas of the western Indian Ocean, from Mozambique to Somalia, between latitudes 13° N and 29° S, at depths between 340 and 765 m.

References

mud catshark
Fish of Mozambique
Fish of Somalia
mud catshark
Taxonomy articles created by Polbot